Colobothea sinaloensis is a species of beetle in the family Cerambycidae. It was described by Giesbert in 1979. It is known from Mexico.

References

sinaloensis
Beetles described in 1979